Trevor Swift (14 September 1948 – 18 February 2022) was an English professional footballer who played in the Football League for Rotherham United. Swift died on 18 February 2022, at the age of 73.

References

1948 births
2022 deaths
English footballers
Footballers from Rotherham
Association football defenders
English Football League players
Rotherham United F.C. players
Worksop Town F.C. players